Frank Leopold Weil (March 6, 1894 – November 10, 1957) was an American lawyer. He was a founding partner of Weil, Gotshal & Manges in 1931.

Born in New York City, Weil attended Columbia Law School, where he became friends with Samuel Irving Rosenman. After graduating with a Bachelor of Laws degree in 1917, he practiced at Elkus, Gleason & Proskauer.

Weil was married to former Henrietta Simons, the granddaughter of Moses Alexander.

References 

1894 births
1957 deaths
American Jews
20th-century American lawyers
Columbia Law School alumni
Proskauer Rose people